The Royal Brussels Cricket Club is a cricket ground in Waterloo, Belgium, home to the Royal Brussels Cricket Club. In February 2019, it was announced that the venue would host three Twenty20 International (T20I) matches in May 2019, between Belgium and Germany.

References

Cricket grounds in Belgium
Sport in Belgium